Zakopane Style (or Witkiewicz Style) is an art style, most visible in architecture, but also found in furniture and related objects, inspired by the regional art of Poland's highland regions, most notably Podhale. Drawing on the motifs and traditions in the buildings of the Carpathian Mountains, this synthesis was created by Stanisław Witkiewicz who was born in the Lithuanian village of Pašiaušė, and is now considered to be one of the core traditions of the Goral people.

Development
As the Podhale region developed into a tourist area in the mid-19th century, the population of Zakopane began to rise. The new buildings to house these new well-to-do inhabitants was built in the style of Swiss and later Austro-Hungarian chalets.

Stanislaw Witkiewicz, an art critic, architect, painter, novelist and journalist, was chosen to design a villa for Zygmunt Gnatowski. In his plans, Witkiewicz decided against using foreign building styles and instead chose to utilize the local traditions used by the native Górals of Podhale. Drawing on the Vernacular architecture of the Carpathians, Witkiewicz used as a model the modest but richly decorated homes in Góral villages such as Chochołów which he further enriched by incorporating select elements of Art Nouveau style, thus giving birth to the "Zakopane Style". This building, known as the Villa "Koliba" was built between 1892 and 1894, and it still stands to this day on Koscieliska Street in the mountain resort of Zakopane.

Witkiewicz designed a number of original buildings in Zakopane, including the "Dom pod Jedlami" in the Koziniec district, the chapel in the Jaszczurowka district, Villa "Oksza" on Zamojski Street, the building of the Tatra Museum, the chapel of St. John the Baptist in the parish Church of the Holy Family on Krupówki Street, and the Korniłowicz family chapel in the Bystre district.

Stanislaw Witkiewicz once wrote on the idea of the Zakopane style:

The Zakopane style soon found proponents among other outstanding architects, including Jan Witkiewicz-Koszyc, Wladyslaw Matlakowski, and Walery Eliasz-Radzikowski.

Outside the Polish highlands

The Zakopane style also gained popularity beyond the Polish highlands. In the Warsaw area, attempts were made to adapt the style to brick construction. Examples include Czeslaw Domaniewski's design for a series of train stations and the design for a townhouse located at 30 Chmielna Street in the center of Warsaw. In 1900, the young Kraków-based architect Franciszek Mączyński won an international architectural competition organized by the Paris-based magazine Moniteur des Architectes with a design of a villa in the Zakopane style. There was also the Chata built for author Stefan Żeromski in Nałęczów, a series of villas in Wisła as well as in Konstancin and Anin and a brick tenement by Jan Starowicz dubbed "Beneath the Góral" in Łódź, as well as the train station in Saldutiškis, Lithuania.

Additionally, the Góral diaspora has incorporated the norms and designs of the Zakopane Style of Architecture into homes, chapels and community buildings that serve their community, such as the Polish Highlanders Alliance of North America in Chicago, or the chapel on the grounds of the Polish National Alliance's Youth Camp in Yorkville.

Today

The Zakopane style dominated architecture in the Podhale and other Goral Lands for many years. Although the cutoff date for buildings designed in the Zakopane Style of Architecture is usually held to be 1914, many new pensions, villas and highlander homes are built according to the architectural model devised by Witkiewicz to the present day. The museum of the Zakopane Style of Architecture located in the Villa "Koliba" first designed by Witkiewicz provides visitors with information on the Zakopane style.

See also
 Polish Highlanders Alliance of North America
 Sanctuary of Our Lady of Ludźmierz

References

External links

 Edyta Barucka, Redefining Polishness: The Revival of Crafts in Galicia around 1900, Acta Slavica Iaponica, Tomus 28, pp. 71‒99
Gorals
Culture in Zakopane
Architecture in Poland
Vernacular architecture
 
Art Nouveau architecture